Just Getting Started is the seventh studio album by the Canadian rock band Loverboy, released in 2007. It was their first album of original material since 1997, and their first album to feature bassist Ken Sinnaeve.

For fans who purchased the album on CD, a bonus song download and booklet were offered on Rockstar Records' official website.

Track listing
"Just Getting Started" (Mike Reno, Anthony Anderson, Dane DeViller, Adam Hursfield, Sean Hosein, Steve Smith) 3:25
"Fade to Black" (Reno, Anderson, DeViller, Hursfield, Hosein, Smith) 3:34
"One of Them Days" (Reno, DeViller, Hosein, Hursfield, Paul Dean) 3:27
"Back for More" (Steve Kipner, DeViller, Hosein) 3:49
"Lost With You" (Reno, Anderson, DeViller, Hursfield, Hosein, Smith) 3:40
"I Would Die for You" (Reno, Anderson, DeViller, Hursfield, Hosein, Smith) 3:59
"The Real Thing" (Reno, Haydain Neale, Davor Vulama) 3:52
"The One that Got Away" (Reno, DeViller, Hursfield, Hosein) 3:51
"As Good as it Gets" (Reno, Hursfield, Vulama) 3:47
"Stranded" (Reno, Anderson, DeViller, Hursfield, Hosein, Smith) 3:46

Personnel
Loverboy
Mike Reno -– lead vocals
Paul Dean – guitar, backing vocals
Doug Johnson – keyboards
Ken Sinnaeve – bass
Matt Frenette – drums

Additional personnel
Phil Collen – backing vocals on "Stranded"

References

Loverboy albums
2007 albums